Hans von Kantzow (9 June 1887 – 12 April 1979) was a mountain engineer and industry man, managing director and CEO at Bultfabriks AB in Hallstahammar 1918–1957. Von Kantzow is known to have invented the steel alloy Kanthal. In 1931 AB Kanthal was founded for the exploitation of the invention.

References

1887 births
1979 deaths
People from Storfors Municipality
20th-century Swedish inventors
20th-century Swedish engineers